Alessio Geromoaddi (died 1611) was a Roman Catholic prelate who served as Bishop of Isernia (1606–1611).

Biography
Alessio Geromoaddi was born in Terni, Italy in 1545.
On 24 April 1606, he was appointed during the papacy of Pope Paul V as Bishop of Isernia.
He served as Bishop of Isernia until his death on 6 April 1611.

References

External links and additional sources
 (for Chronology of Bishops) 
 (for Chronology of Bishops)  

17th-century Italian Roman Catholic bishops
Bishops appointed by Pope Paul V
1545 births
1611 deaths